Arachnoidea is a monotypic genus of bryozoans belonging to the family Arachnidiidae. The only species is Arachnoidea raylankesteri.

The species is found in Australia.

References

Ctenostomatida